Africa's Great Civilizations is a PBS six-hour television series hosted and written by Henry Louis Gates Jr. It aired on PBS in the United States in February 2017.

In the series, Gates chronicles African history starting with the birth of humankind to the start of the 20th century. The show portrays 200,000 years of Africa's history and touches on subjects from the arts to writing and the dawn of civilization to the 21st century.

The series' six episodes are:
"Origins" (Omo River, Mitochondrial Eve, Nubian pyramids, Bantu expansion)
"The Cross and the Crescent" (Yeha, North African Christian theologians, Islam in Africa, the Ethiopian Orthodox Church, Lake Tana)
"Empires of Gold" (Fez, Timbuktu, University of al-Qarawiyyin, Mali Empire)
"Cities" (Kilwa, Great Zimbabwe, Benin, Gondar)
"The Atlantic Age" (Kingdom of Kongo, Nzinga of Ndongo and Matamba, Ouidah, the Atlantic slave trade)
"Commerce and the Clash of Civilizations" (Zulu Kingdom, Zanzibar, the Scramble for Africa, Ethiopian Empire)

On April 26, 2017, Gates introduced the series at the United Nations. The event was spearheaded by the Africa-America Institute. The series was released on both Blu-ray and DVD on May 16, 2017.

Reception
The New York Times praised the series, but said it would have been good if it made more connections between the civilisations of the past and modern Africa. Multifaith website Spirituality & Practice called the series "ambitious and poignant;" while the UK Independent called it "Endlessly enthralling and tremendously dramatic."

References

External links

2017 American television series debuts
2010s American documentary television series
Historical television series
PBS original programming
Works about Africa